The following are lists of affiliates of the CW television network:

List of The CW affiliates (by U.S. state)
List of The CW affiliates (table)

See also
Lists of ABC television affiliates
Lists of CBS television affiliates
Lists of Fox television affiliates
Lists of NBC television affiliates

Affiliates